The Waco E series is a small family of American-built cabin biplanes built between 1939 and 1942, which differed primarily by engine installation.

Development and design

The E series was the final development of the prewar Waco line of biplane designs. A full four-seater, it had the best performance of any of the Wacos. First flown in 1939, it had a much slimmer and more streamlined fuselage than earlier Waco C and S models and heavily staggered unequal-span parallel-chord wings with rounded tips. Wings were plywood-skinned, and also had wire cross-bracing between the wings in place of the solid struts used on previous models.

Production ceased in 1942.
Note: the Waco GXE of 1929/30 was an unrelated biplane design with non-staggered wings

Operational history

The E series was sold to wealthier private pilot owners who required the comfort of a fully enclosed cabin and a high cruising speed, combined with a longer range. Because of the type's good performance, 15 examples were impressed by the United States Army Air Forces during World War II for communications work as the UC-72. Several of the USAAF examples were returned to civilian use after the end of the war and five E series aircraft remained airworthy in 2001.

Variants

(Source : Aerofiles)
ARE Aristocrat   Jacobs L-6 (4 built, one impressed as UC-72A)
HRE Aristocrat   Lycoming R-680 (5 built, 2 impressed as UC-72C)
SRE Aristocrat   Pratt & Whitney R-985 Wasp Junior SB-2 (21 built, 12 impressed as UC-72)
WRE Aristocrat   Wright R-975 - model offered to potential customers, but none built

Impressed aircraft

UC-7212 impressed  Waco SRE for USAAF
UC-72AOne impressed Waco ARE
UC-72CTwo impressed Waco HRE

Specifications (SRE)

See also

Notes

References

Green, William, The Aircraft of the World, 1965, MacDonald & Co (Publishers) Ltd, ISBN none
Simpson, Rod, Airlife's World Aircraft, 2001, Airlife Publishing Ltd,

External links

 Details and photographs of the Waco E series on Aerofiles

E series
1930s United States civil utility aircraft
Sesquiplanes
Single-engined tractor aircraft
Aircraft first flown in 1939